Jefferson County Jail may refer to:

 Jefferson County Jail (Monticello, Florida), listed on the National Register of Historic Places (NRHP) in Jefferson County
 Jefferson County Jail (Madison, Indiana), NRHP-listed in Jefferson County
 Jefferson County Jail (Louisville, Kentucky), NRHP-listed in Jefferson County